Winsted Township is a township in McLeod County, Minnesota, United States. The population was 987 at the 2000 census.

Winsted Township was named after Winsted, Connecticut.

Geography
According to the United States Census Bureau, the township has a total area of 34.6 square miles (89.6 km), of which 33.5 square miles (86.8 km)  is land and 1.1 square miles (2.9 km)  (3.21%) is water.

Demographics
As of the census of 2000, there were 987 people, 330 households, and 287 families residing in the township. There were 342 housing units at an average density of 10.2/sq mi (3.9/km). The racial makeup of the township was 98.68% White, 0.10% Asian, 0.81% from other races, and 0.41% from two or more races. Hispanic or Latino of any race were 1.52% of the population.

There were 330 households, out of which 38.5% had children under the age of 18 living with them, 77.0% were married couples living together, 4.8% had a female householder with no husband present, and 13.0% were non-families. 9.7% of all households were made up of individuals, and 5.8% had someone living alone who was 65 years of age or older.  The average household size was 2.99 and the average family size was 3.21.

In the township the population was spread out, with 29.2% under the age of 18, 7.0% from 18 to 24, 30.3% from 25 to 44, 23.0% from 45 to 64, and 10.5% who were 65 years of age or older.  The median age was 36 years. For every 100 females, there were 106.1 males.  For every 100 females age 18 and over, there were 109.3 males.

The median income for a household in the township was $52,778, and the median income for a family was $56,563. Males had a median income of $32,316 versus $25,000 for females. The per capita income for the township was $19,060.  About 5.9% of families and 6.7% of the population were below the poverty line, including 8.7% of those under age 18 and 5.6% of those age 65 or over.

References

Townships in McLeod County, Minnesota
Townships in Minnesota